Piplod is an upmarket locality in the city of Surat. It is home to Gaurav Path, which is dotted with multiplexes and malls.

Location
Piplod is located in the Athwalines suburb of Surat. It lies South of the river Tapi and is connected to the older city by three bridges. A fourth one is coming soon.

References

Neighbourhoods in Surat